Robert Markovac (born 21 June 1967) is a retired Croatian Australian soccer midfielder.

External links

1967 births
Living people
Australian people of Croatian descent
Australian soccer players
National Soccer League (Australia) players
Croatian Football League players
League of Ireland players
Victorian Premier League players
Brisbane Strikers FC players
HNK Hajduk Split players
Waterford F.C. players
Guangzhou F.C. players
Sydney United 58 FC players
Association football midfielders